The 12943 / 12944 Valsad–Kanpur Central Udyog Karmi Express is a Superfast Express express train of the Indian Railways in the Western Railway zone that runs between Valsad and Kanpur in India.

It operates as train number 12943 from Valsad to Kanpur Central and as train number 12944 in the reverse direction serving the states of Gujarat, Maharashtra, Madhya Pradesh & Uttar Pradesh.

The train has been named 'Udyog Karmi' which translates to Industrial Worker in Devanagari as the train connects the two important industrial cities of Valsad & Kanpur in their respective states of Gujarat & Uttar Pradesh.

Coaches

The 12943 / 12944 Valsad–Kanpur Central Udyog Karmi Express presently has 2 AC 2 tier 6 AC 3 tier, 8 Sleeper Class, 4 Unreserved/General, 1 End on Generator & 1 Seating cum Luggage Rake coaches. It does not carry a pantry car.

As is customary with most train services in India, coach composition may be amended at the discretion of Indian Railways depending on demand.

Service

12943  Valsad–Kanpur Central Udyog Karmi Express covers the distance of 1,305 km in 20 hours 10 mins (65 km/hr) & in 21 hours 40 mins as 12944 Kanpur Central–Valsad Udyog Karmi Express (60 km/hr).

As the average speed of the train is above , as per Indian Railways rules, its fare includes a Superfast surcharge.

Route & Halts

Traction

As the route is fully electrified, a Vadodara based WAP-7 locomotive hauls the train for its entire journey.

Schedule

Rake sharing

The train shares its rake with 19051/19052 Shramik Express.

References

External links

Transport in Valsad
Trains from Kanpur
Express trains in India
Rail transport in Gujarat
Rail transport in Madhya Pradesh
Rail transport in Maharashtra
Railway services introduced in 2007
Named passenger trains of India